Ruhlsdorf is a village and a civil parish (Ortsteil) of the German town of Strausberg, located in the district of Märkisch-Oderland in Brandenburg. With a population of 44 (as of 2007), it is the littlest one of its municipality.

Geography
The village is situated at the eastern borders of its municipality, close to Hohenstein and in the territory of the Märkische Schweiz Nature Park. It is crossed by a road linking Strausberg and Buckow and, in south of the inhabited area, it lies a little lake named Ruhlsdorfer See.

Tourism
Ruhlsdorf is a receptive place for tourism due to its natural environment and to its position in a nature park.

See also
Strausberg
Gladowshöhe
Hohenstein

References

External links

Villages in Brandenburg
Strausberg
Former municipalities in Brandenburg